Žižka (feminine Žižková) is a Czech surname. Notable people with the surname include:

 Jan Žižka (1360–1424), Czech Hussite leader
 Ladislav Žižka, Czech biathlete
 Tomáš Žižka (born 1979), Czech ice hockey player

Czech-language surnames